The 2019 Rally Italia Sardegna (also known as Rally Italia Sardegna 2019) was a motor racing event for rally cars that was held over four days between 13 and 16 June 2019. It marked the sixteenth running of Rally Italia Sardegna and was the eighth round of the 2019 World Rally Championship, World Rally Championship-2 and the newly-created WRC-2 Pro class. It was also the third round of the Junior World Rally Championship.

Thierry Neuville and Nicolas Gilsoul were the defending rally winners. Their team, Hyundai Shell Mobis WRT, were the defending manufacturers' winners. Jan Kopecký and Pavel Dresler were the defending winners in the World Rally Championship-2 category, but they did not defend their titles as they participated in the newly-created WRC-2 Pro class.

Dani Sordo and Carlos del Barrio won their second career victory. Their team, Hyundai Shell Mobis WRT, successfully defended their titles. The Škoda Motorsport crew of Kalle Rovanperä and Jonne Halttunen took hat-trick in the WRC-2 Pro category, finishing first in the combined WRC-2 category, while the French crew of Pierre-Louis Loubet and Vincent Landais won the wider WRC-2 class. The third round of the J-WRC championship was taken by the Rally Team Spain crew of Jan Solans and Mauro Barreiro.

Background

Championship standings prior to the event
Defending world champions Sébastien Ogier and Julien Ingrassia led both the drivers' and co-drivers' championships with a two-point ahead of Ott Tänak and Martin Järveoja. Thierry Neuville and Nicolas Gilsoul were third, a further ten points behind. In the World Rally Championship for Manufacturers, Hyundai Shell Mobis WRT held a twenty-point lead over Toyota Gazoo Racing WRT.

In the World Rally Championship-2 Pro standings, Kalle Rovanperä and Jonne Halttunen held a three-point lead ahead of Mads Østberg and Torstein Eriksen in the drivers' and co-drivers' standings respectively. Łukasz Pieniążek and Elliott Edmondson were third, nine and ten points further back respectively. In the manufacturers' championship, M-Sport Ford WRT led Škoda Motorsport by thirty-one points, with Citroën Total thirty-three points further behind in third.

In the World Rally Championship-2 standings, Benito Guerra and Jaime Zapata led the drivers' and co-drivers' standings by twenty-two points respectively. Takamoto Katsuta and Daniel Barritt were second, following by Ole Christian Veiby and Jonas Andersson in third.

In the Junior-World Rally Championship standings, Tom Kristensson and Henrik Appelskog led Jan Solans and Mauro Barreiro by thirteen points in the drivers' and co-drivers' standings respectively, with Dennis Rådström and Johan Johansson two points further behind in third in their own standings. In the Nations' standings, Sweden were first, thirteen points clear of Spain, with Estonia two points further behind in third.

Entry list
The following crews entered into the rally. The event opened to crews competing in the World Rally Championship, World Rally Championship-2, WRC-2 Pro, Junior World Rally Championship, Italian national championship and privateer entries not registered to score points in any championship. A total of ninety-four entries were received, with twelve crews entered with World Rally Cars and fifteen entered the World Rally Championship-2. Five crews were nominated to score points in the Pro class. A further eleven entries were received for the Junior World Rally Championship.

Route
The Ittiri Arena stage will be removed from the itinerary as well as some slight length-adjustments to selected stages.

Itinerary
All dates and times are CEST (UTC+2).

Report

World Rally Cars
The first leg saw defending world champion Sébastien Ogier, who was the road-cleaner in Sardinia, caught out after hitting a huge rock in the morning loop. Ogier's Citroën C3 sustained serious suspension damage, forcing him and co-driver Julien Ingrassia to retire from the stage. Teemu Suninen took an early lead until a spin handed the lead to Jari-Matti Latvala, who rolled his Yaris in the afternoon loop. Things went from bad to worse as the Finn went off the road in the final stage of the leg. Thierry Neuville also hit trouble as his i20 slid nose-first into a ditch, with the Hyundai's radiator being pierced in the ordeal. Eventually, Dani Sordo became the overnight leader.

On day two, with a much better road position, Ott Tänak took over the rally — he dominated the day and won all six stages, turning a ten-second deficit to a twenty-five-second lead. However, his teammate Kris Meeke had to change a punctured tyre in the final test, which dropped him down from fifth to eighth.

Things went against Tänak's favour in the power stage, however, when a late power steering failure deprived the Estonian of a third consecutive rally win, handing the victory to Sordo; his first rally win since the 2013 Rallye Deutschland.

Classification

Special stages

Championship standings

World Rally Championship-2 Pro
Mads Østberg was very likely to lead the category, but he lost almost eleven minutes adrift after hitting a stone in the opening stage, which meant Kalle Rovanperä became the leader. Gus Greensmith retired from the day due to plunging down a bank. Although he restarted on Saturday, a suspension failure forced him to stop again. Eventually, Rovanperä won the category as well as played a hat-trick.

Classification

Special stages
Results in bold denote first in the RC2 class, the class which both the WRC-2 Pro and WRC-2 championships run to.

Championship standings

World Rally Championship-2
Pierre-Louis Loubet enjoyed a troublefree day in the lead. The major retirements of the leg included Fabio Andolfi, who ripped a front wheel from his Fabia, and Ole Christian Veiby due to multiple issues. On day two, Nikolay Gryazin retired from second when he hit a rock and ripped off his right-front wheel. Back to the front, Takamoto Katsuta surpassed Loubet in the final test of the leg. However, his car was on fire on the final day and forced to retire from the rally, which handled the victory back to the former category leader Loubet.

Classification

Special stages
Results in bold denote first in the RC2 class, the class which both the WRC-2 Pro and WRC-2 championships run to.

Championship standings

Junior World Rally Championship
Dennis Rådström dominated the first day, while Sean Johnston retired from the leg due to clipping a bank and plunging off the road. Rådström maintained the lead on leg two, but his lead was slashed to only 1.2 seconds. However, he lost the lead to Jan Solans, who eventually won the J-WRC victory.

Classification

Special stages

Championship standings

Notes

References

External links
  
 2019 Rally Italia Sardegna in e-wrc website
 The official website of the World Rally Championship

Italy
2019 in Italian motorsport
June 2019 sports events in Italy
2019